This is a complete list of episodes for the HOT supernatural drama television series Split. The programma's cast included Amit Farkash as Ella Rosen, Yon Tumarkin as Leo Zachs, Yedidia Vital as Omer Teneh, Avi Kornick as Guy Rosen, Maya Shoef as Zohar Green, Idan Ashkenazi as Moshe "Sushi" Arieli, Anna Zaikin as Nurit "Nicky" Shilon and Lee Biran as Adam. 135 episodes have aired in three seasons, which were all written by Shai Kapon and directed by Shai Alon, Ilan Rosenfeld.

Summary

Season 1 
Season one deals with the girl Ella Rosen who finds out that she is a split (half vampire, half human). Meanwhile, the vampires are searching for a new vampire prophet who becomes their leader.

Season 2
Lilith has been defeated by the old vampire prophet Ardak a thousand years ago. However, her son Adam awakes and comes as a student to the Green High School. He befriends Ella, but is a danger to the vampires. He kills them by touching them.

Season 3 
The third season describes the adventures of the actors of Split.

References

Lists of Israeli drama television series episodes